Danica Dillon is an American retired pornographic actress who debuted in 2009 and then went on to appear in mainstream (non-adult) roles in cable television movies. Dillon is also a featured dancer at men's clubs and is a featured guest on radio and podcast shows.

Career 
In 2009, Dillon was working at a strip club in San Diego, California, when established adult actress Jenna Haze appeared at the club as a featured dancer and told her that she should give doing porn movies a try. Within two weeks of meeting Haze, Dillon had shot her first scene. Since then, Dillon has worked for companies such as Hustler, Naughty America, Twistys, New Sensations, Evil Angel and Immoral Productions. Since her 2009 debut, Dillon has appeared in several large-scale porn productions, such as This Ain't Avatar XXX 3D (Hustler Video), The Human Sexipede (Tom Byron Pictures), and Not The Three Stooges XXX.

Appearances
She was selected to be one of the presenters at the Sex Awards in Hollywood, California.

Dillon started feature dancing at men's clubs in July 2013. Her first appearance was at Gold Club Centerfolds in Rancho Cordova, California.

Dillon was featured in the May/June issue of the Girls of Penthouse in a photo set with porn actor Tommy Gunn titled "Danica Dillon’s Cheating Ways."

Mainstream appearances 
Dillon made her mainstream debut in the TV series Femme Fatales in the Season 1 episodes "Girls Gone Dead" and "Angel & Demons". Her next mainstream project was the Showtime movie Scared Topless. The supernatural-themed thriller features a group of undergraduate students taking a class in "the supernatural and the afterlife." Her role is the daughter of a famous magician who died when she was a young girl.

Personal life 
In early 2014, Dillon had breast augmentation surgery to increase her breast size to a 34DD.

Dillon is married to a United States Marine, with whom she has a son.

Assault 
On November 18, 2015, it was made public that Danica was suing Josh Duggar for US$500,000. The lawsuit claims that Duggar physically assaulted her on two occasions after paying her for sex. In February 2016, Dillon chose to drop the lawsuit after evidence showed that Duggar was not in Philadelphia at the time of the alleged assault.

Awards and nominations

References

External links
 
 
 
 
 

American pornographic film actresses
Living people
People from Ashtabula, Ohio
Pornographic film actors from Ohio
American female erotic dancers
21st-century American women
1987 births